Sierra Salvada is a mountain range situated to the northwest of Burgos (Spain), and it is also part of Alava and Orduña (an enclave on Biscay).
The southern slope of this mountain range, whose rivers flow to the mediterranean sea, is included in  the province of Burgos. However, the north slope is part of the Autonomous Community of the Basque Country. The rivers of this area of Sierra Salvada flow to the Cantabrian coast.

Sierra Salvada is famous because of its peculiar shape, created by its north steep slope,  in length, and because of its biodiversity, That is why Sierra Salvada is considered a Special Protection Area (SPA), in order to protect the different species of birds.

History

This mountain range has been very important between the 16th and 18th centuries, as a communication way between Castilla and the Cantabrian. It is considered an important trade route that connected the Northern Peninsula, and therefore, it was very significant on the commercial communications of the northern area.

Sierra Salvada is known through its limestone area and the speleological researches done there by the caving groups. Among the more than 350 caves located, there is the most famous one, The System of the Beech Forest of Ponata, cavity located and explored by the Speleological Group of Alava (GEA) between 1983 and 2000. This famous cave has  length mapped. Other caves of this mountain range are the Pozalagua System, with  length (explored and mapped by the Speleological Group of Alava and the Edelweiss Caving Group) and the San Miguel or the Old Cave.

Mountains in Sierra Salvada
Urieta – 
Aro – 
Ungino – 
Tologorri – 
Bedarbide – 
Solaiera – 
Txarlazo – 
Arando –

See also

Physical geography of Euskal Herria
Speleology
Basque Mountains

References

External links
 Birding Euskadi: Sierra Salvada(Spanish)
 Álava Turismo: Sierra Salvada(Spanish)

Salvada
Salvada